Father Peadar Ua Laoghaire or Peadar Ó Laoghaire (first name locally ; 30 April 1839 – 21 March 1920), also anglicized as Peter O'Leary, was an Irish writer and Catholic priest, who is regarded today as one of the founders of modern literature in Irish.

Life
He was born in Liscarrigane in the parish of Clondrohid, County Cork, and grew up speaking Munster Irish in the Muskerry Gaeltacht. He was a descendant of the Carrignacurra branch of the Ó Laoghaire of the ancient Corcu Loígde.

He attended Maynooth College and was ordained a priest of the Roman Catholic Church in 1867. He became a parish priest in Castlelyons in 1891, and it was there that he wrote his most famous story, and told it as a fireside story to three little girls.  was the first major literary work of the emerging Gaelic revival. It was serialised in the Gaelic Journal from 1894, and published in book form in 1904. The plot of the story concerns a deal that the shoemaker Séadna struck with "the Dark Man". Although the story is rooted in the folklore the writer heard from shanachies by the fire during his youth, it is also closely related to the German legend of Faust. It was first published as a serial in various Irish-language magazines.

Apart from Séadna, Ua Laoghaoire wrote an autobiography called  ("My Own Story"), published by Norma Borthwick's Irish Book Company. In addition, he translated some stories of medieval Gaelic literature into modern Irish, such as Eisirt and An Cleasaí, and translated an abridged version of Don Quixote into his local dialect of Irish.

Before I left Liscarrigane, I had never heard from anybody's mouth phrases such as "tá mé", "bhí mé", "bhí siad"; I always used to hear "táim", "bhíos", "bhíodar", etc. Little things! – but little things that come repeatedly into conversation. A taut mode of expression, as against one that is lax, makes for finish in speech; in the same manner, a lax mode of expression as against the taut, makes for speech that is deficient. Besides, the taut speech possesses a force and a vigour that cannot be contained in speech that is falling apart...The loose mode of expression is prominent in Gaelic today and English is nothing else. English has fallen apart completely.

Accordingly, he strongly promoted Cork Irish as what he saw as the best Irish for propagation among the Irish people.

He died in Castlelyons at the age of 80.

Works
The following is a partial list of his works:

 Ar nDóithin Araon, 1894
 Mion-chaint, an easy Irish phrase book, compiled for the Gaelic League, 1899
 Eólas ar áireamh, arithmetical tables in Irish, 1902
 An Soísgéal as Leabar an aifrinn, 1902 (the liturgical readers from the Missal)
 Irish prose composition: a series of articles, including several upon the Irish autonomous verb, 1902
 Aesop a Tháinig go hÉirinn, 1903
 Sgothbhualadh, a series of articles in Irish reprinted from the "Leader", 1904
 Séadna, 1904 (originally serialised in 1898)
 An Craos-Deamhan, 1905
 An Bealach Buidhe, a drama, 1906
 Tóruigheacht Dhiarmuda agus Ghráinne, 1906
 Niamh 1907
 Eisirt, 1909
 Seanmóin agus trí fichid, sermons for every Sunday and holy day of the year, 1909–10
 An sprid: Bas Dalláin: Tadhg Saor, three short plays, 1911
 An Cleasaidhe, 1913
 Caitilina, 1913
 Aithris ar Chríost, 1914 (a translation into Irish of Thomas à Kempis' 'Imitatio Christi')
 Sliabh na mban bhFionn agus Cúan Fithise, 1914
 Lughaidh Mac Con, 1914
 Bricriu, 1915
 Na Cheithre Soisgéil as an dTiomna Nua, 1915 (a translation into Irish of the Four Gospels)
 Mo Sgéal Féin, 1915
 Guaire, 1915
 Ag Séideadh agus ag ithe, 1918
 An teagasg críosdaidhe, edited by Ua Laoghaire, 1920
 Don Cíchóté, a partial translation of Miguel de Cervantes' early 17th century novel Don Quixote, 1921
 Gníomhartha na nAspol, 1921 (a translation into Irish of the Acts of the Apostles)
 Lúcián, 1924
 Sgéalaidheachta as an mBíobla naomhtha, 1924 (stories from the Bible)
 Críost Mac Dé, 1925
 Sgealaidheacht na Macabéach, 1926 (the stories of the Maccabees from the Apocrypha)
 Aodh Ruadh, an adaptation of the life of Hugh Roe O'Donnell (Aodh Ruadh Ó Domhnaill) originally by Lughaidh Ó Cléirigh in the 17th century, 1929
 Notes on Irish words and usages
 Papers on Irish idiom : together with a translation into Irish of part of the first book of Euclid, by the late canon Peter O'Leary; edited by Thomas F. O'Rahilly.
 Cómhairle ár leasa, articles published in the "Leader"
 Mo shlighe chun Dé : leabhar urnaighthe

An article listing 487 of Ua Laoghaire's articles and works was published in Celtica in 1954.

See also
Feardorcha Ó Conaill

References

''This page includes material translated from the corresponding article at the Irish Wikipedia as of 2007-10-07.

1839 births
1920 deaths
19th-century Irish Roman Catholic priests
19th-century Irish writers
Alumni of St Patrick's College, Maynooth
Irish memoirists
Irish translators
Irish-language writers
People educated at St Colman's College, Fermoy
People from County Cork
Translators of the Bible into Irish
Translators to Irish